The Bocce event at the 2021 Islamic Solidarity Games was held in Konya, Turkey, from 9 to 12 August 2022.

The Games were originally scheduled to take place from 20 to 29 August 2021 at the  TÜYAP Konya International Fair Center in Konya, Turkey. In May 2020, the Islamic Solidarity Sports Federation (ISSF), who are responsible for the direction and control of the Islamic Solidarity Games, postponed the games as the 2020 Summer Olympics were postponed to July and August 2021, due to the global COVID-19 pandemic.

Medalists

Lyonnaise

Raffa

Medal table

Participating nations
A total of 39 athletes from 6 nations competed in bocce at the 2021 Islamic Solidarity Games:

References

External links 
Official website
Results book

2021 Islamic Solidarity Games
2021
Islamic Solidarity Games
International sports competitions hosted by Turkey